Delight is the second extended play by South Korean singer Baekhyun. It was released on May 25, 2020, by SM Entertainment, and features seven tracks, including the lead single, "Candy". The album is available in four versions: Cinnamon, Honey, Mint, and Chemistry, which was released on June 29.

The album sold over 1,000,000 copies, making it the first album by a South Korean soloist to do so in 19 years, and one of the best-selling albums in South Korea.

Background and release 
Baekhyun debuted as a solo artist in July 2019, with City Lights, which was commercially successful and sold over half-a-million copies in 2019. On April 22, 2020, it was reported that he was preparing for a second solo album and participated in various aspects of the production process. SM Entertainment later confirmed the statement and announced the release of Baekhyun's second EP in late May. On May 6, the album's title and release date were announced.

SM Entertainment began releasing teasers and mood-sampler videos on May 12 through Exo's official social media accounts. On May 13, the album's notable producers were revealed, consisting of South Korean producer Kenzie, and American producers Mike Daley, Omega Deez and Colde.

The album and its title track's music video were released on May 25 at 6PM KST both digitally and physically. On May 29, the live video for "Love Again" was released on YouTube via the SM Station channel.

Composition 
Delight features seven songs of different R&B subgenres. The title track "Candy" is described as a future R&B song with addictive synth instrumentation and a trendy melody. Lyrically, it expresses Baekhyun's colourful charms like various tastes of candy including, cinnamon, mint, strawberry and bubble gum. It was written by songwriter Kenzie, while production was handled by Mike Daley, Mitchell Owens, DEEZA and Adrian McKinnon with additional arrangement by Yoo Yeong-jin.

"R U Ridin'?" is an urban R&B hip hop song with a chill trap-based instrumentation and melody with love-whispering lyrics that make you feel like you're driving through the downtown of a city. The third track "Bungee" is a mid-tempo R&B song with a piano melody. The lyrics are a metaphor for falling in love and swimming in the sea. "Poppin'" is characterized as an urban R&B hip hop song, with lyrics expressing the overwhelming feelings of happiness that burst out while in love. "Underwater" is a dreamy mid-tempo R&B song with lyrics about the feeling of ones heart submerged in an ocean of sadness after losing someone they loved, while "Ghost" is described as an alternative R&B song featuring lyrics about comparing a lover to a ghost in order to endure the hardships of separation from them. The last song "Love Again" is a lyrical contemporary R&B song with lyrics about longing to love a partner once more at the end of a relationship.

Promotion 
An hour before the music video and album's release, Baekhyun appeared on a live broadcast through the Naver app V Live, where he promoted and discussed the album. On June 3, Baekhyun won his first Show Champion trophy with "Candy", despite not attending nor performing at the show. Baekhyun had his first music show performance for the lead single on Music Bank, followed by his promotion on Inkigayo. The song has since achieved a total of three trophies, tying with "UN Village" as his most winning title on such television music shows.

Commercial performance 
On May 25, 2020, Korean news media reported that pre-orders for Delight had reached 732,297 copies as of May 24, making it the most pre-ordered album by a solo artist in South Korean history. Upon release, the album recorded the highest first week sales for a solo artist in Gaon chart history and debuted at number one on the Album Chart for the week 22 issue ending May 30. It topped the monthly chart for May with a total of 660,826 copies sold. Following the release of its Kit version on June 26, the album returned to number one on the week 27 chart issue for the period ending July 4.

In June, Delight surpassed 971,000 cumulative sales, making Baekhyun the first soloist to qualify for Triple Platinum certification from the Korea Music Copyright Association (KMCA). On July 1, it was announced that the album had surpassed 1 million sales, making it the first album by a soloist in South Korea to do so since Another Days (2001) by Kim Gun-mo.

Internationally, the album debuted at number five on the Billboard World Albums chart in the United States, giving Baekhyun his second top-five entry on the ranking. In Japan, it charted at number 9 on the Oricon Albums Chart.

Track listing

Charts

Weekly charts

Year-end charts

Certifications and sales

Awards and nominations

Release history

See also 
 List of best-selling albums in South Korea
 List of K-pop songs on the Billboard charts
 List of K-pop albums on the Billboard charts
 List of Gaon Album Chart number ones of 2020

References

Baekhyun albums
2020 EPs
SM Entertainment albums
Korean-language EPs
IRiver EPs